Roger de Santis Guedes (born 3 November 1953) is a Brazilian former professional tennis player.

Guedes, born and raised in Bauru, was a junior Banana Bowl champion and attended Hampton Institute on a full scholarship. In 1976, he played in the NCAA Division II championship-winning team and also partneredBruce Foxworth to win the doubles championship.

On the professional tour, Guedes had a career high ranking of 89 in the world and, despite being one of the Brazil's top players, never received a Davis Cup call up. He won a first round match at the 1979 French Open and also made main draw appearance at Wimbledon and the US Open. His best performance on the Grand Prix circuit was a quarter-final appearance at Bogota in 1979, with wins over João Soares and Álvaro Betancur.

References

External links
 
 

1953 births
Living people
Brazilian male tennis players
People from Bauru
Sportspeople from São Paulo (state)
Hampton Pirates tennis players
20th-century Brazilian people
21st-century Brazilian people